Vítor Ricardo dos Santos Soares (born 18 December 1994), known as Ricardo dos Santos, is a Portuguese sprinter specialising in the 400 metres. He won a bronze medal at the 2018 Ibero-American Championships. He reached the 400m final at the 2018 European Championships, setting a Portuguese national record of 45.14 in the semifinals.

Personal life
Dos Santos is in a relationship with British sprinter Bianca Williams with whom he has a child, born 2020.

International competitions

Personal bests
Outdoor
100 metres – 10.60 (+1.0 m/s, Tampa 2015)
200 metres – 20.78 (+1.9 m/s, Kortrijk 2018)
400 metres – 45.14 (Berlin 2018)

Indoor
200 metres – 21.57 (Sheffield 2014)
400 metres – 47.14 (Pombal 2018)

References

1994 births
Living people
Athletes from Lisbon
Portuguese male sprinters
Athletes (track and field) at the 2019 European Games
European Games medalists in athletics
European Games bronze medalists for Portugal
Athletes (track and field) at the 2018 Mediterranean Games
Mediterranean Games competitors for Portugal
Members of Thames Valley Harriers
Athletes (track and field) at the 2020 Summer Olympics
Olympic athletes of Portugal
S.L. Benfica athletes